Morocco is a source, destination, and transit country for men, women, and children who are subjected to trafficking in persons, specifically forced labor and forced prostitution. Children are trafficked within the country from rural areas to urban centers to work as maids or laborers, or for commercial sexual exploitation. Moroccan men, women, and children are exploited for forced labor and prostitution in European and Middle Eastern countries. Young Moroccan girls from rural areas are recruited to work as child maids in cities, but often experience non-payment of wages, threats, and physical or sexual abuse, and sometimes face restrictions on movement. These practices indicate that these girls are subjected to involuntary servitude. Moroccan boys experience forced labor as apprentices in the artisan and construction industries and in mechanic shops.  A few Moroccan men and boys are lured to Europe by fraudulent job offers, and are subsequently forced to sell drugs. In addition, men and women from sub-Saharan Africa, South Asia, and the Philippines enter Morocco voluntarily but illegally with the assistance of smugglers; once in Morocco, some of the women are coerced into prostitution or, less frequently, forced into domestic service. Nigerian gangs, who engage in a variety of criminal activities like human smuggling and drug trafficking, compete to control the trafficking of sub-Saharan Africans in Morocco.

The Government of Morocco does not comply with the minimum standards for the elimination of trafficking; however, it is making significant efforts to do so. The government convicted one person who subjected a 13-year-old child domestic worker to forced labor, though it continued to lack overall progress in the following areas: convicting and punishing trafficking offenders with punishments commensurate with the heinous nature of the offense; proactively identifying trafficking victims among vulnerable groups; and ensuring that foreign trafficking victims are not subject to arrest and deportation. The government also continues to conflate migrant smuggling and human trafficking. U.S. State Department's Office to Monitor and Combat Trafficking in Persons placed the country in "Tier 2"  in 2017.

Prosecution
The Government of Morocco made progress in investigating trafficking offenses and punishing trafficking offenders during the reporting period. Moroccan law appears to prohibit all forms of trafficking. Its Penal Code prohibits forced child labor through Article 467, forced labor through Article 10, and forced prostitution and prostitution of a minor through Articles 497–499. The Government of Morocco reports that it also employs the Immigration Law of 2003 and other statutes, such as those prohibiting kidnapping, fraud, and coercion, to prosecute trafficking offenses; however, it has not provided any information on cases tried under these laws. Penalties prescribed by these various statutes for sex trafficking offenses are sufficiently stringent and commensurate with those prescribed for other serious crimes, such as rape. In contrast, penalties prescribed for labor trafficking offenses appear not to be sufficiently stringent; penalties for child labor under Article 467 range from one to three years' imprisonment, while general penalties for forced labor under Article 10 are limited to fines for first-time offenders or six days' to three months' imprisonment for repeat offenders. The government took criminal action against at least one high-profile case of physical or sexual abuse of child domestic workers. In October 2009, a court convicted the wife of a judge who subjected a child domestic worker to forced labor; she was convicted of intentional assault and battery on a child under the age of 15, as well as the use of a weapon with malicious intent, and sentenced to three and a half years' imprisonment. The Ministry of Justice reported that it prosecuted 138 individuals for exploitation of a child for begging and 203 individuals for facilitating the prostitution of a child for the most recent year in which data was available; it is unclear how many, if any, of these prosecutions involved human trafficking offenses. Their sentences ranged from one month to two years' imprisonment. The government reported that it broke up 130 trafficking or smuggling rings in 2009. However, the government made no distinction between migrant smuggling and trafficking, so it was unclear how many, if any, were truly human trafficking rings.

Protection
Morocco made limited progress in protecting victims of trafficking over the last year. Foreign trafficking victims are often treated as undocumented migrants, subject to arrest and deportation. Government officials continued to detain and deport large numbers of undocumented sub-Saharan migrants without taking adequate steps to identify trafficking victims among them. These detained migrants, some of whom may have been trafficking victims, were usually left at the Algerian border, often without food or water. There were reports that some were robbed, assaulted, and sexually abused by criminal gangs that operate in the area. The government did not offer legal alternatives to the removal of foreign victims of trafficking to countries where they might face retribution or hardship. Morocco does not encourage victims to participate in investigations against their traffickers. Some victims reportedly testified but were subsequently deported. Sub-Saharan African women who are forced into prostitution in Morocco were not likely to report crimes for fear of being deported. NGOs provided most services to domestic victims of trafficking. Undocumented migrants – some of whom may have been trafficking victims – reportedly suffered physical abuse at the hands of Moroccan police. Government-operated Child Protection Units in Casablanca and Marrakesh offered assistance to street children and other victims of violence, abuse, and sexual exploitation, possibly including victims of trafficking. The government also operated a hotline that referred women and children who are victims of violence and sexual assault to women's groups for possible assistance. It is uncertain if any trafficking victims were identified or protected through the hotline in the reporting period. According to the Ministry of Foreign Affairs, Moroccan diplomatic missions provided assistance to Moroccans who were trafficked abroad.

Prevention
The Moroccan government made some efforts in preventing human trafficking in 2010. The government included anti-human trafficking modules in training programs for the Royal Gendarmerie, the Auxiliary Forces, and the police. In April 2009, the Ministry of Justice conducted an awareness raising course for magistrates about victim protection and working with trafficking victims who have been affected by violence or sexual exploitation. The government's labor inspectors, who were appointed as child labor focal points in each of the 45 inspector offices, received training from an international organization during the year. Authorities did not raise public awareness of the commercial sexual exploitation of children and women and did not take any reported measures to reduce the demand for commercial sex acts. The Moroccan government provided birth certificates for all nationals, including children in isolated rural areas, and issued national identity cards for all citizens on their 18th birthday. All Moroccan soldiers participating in UN peacekeeping missions receive training on the issue of commercial sexual exploitation. The Moroccan government cooperated with the IOM in preparing a publicly available report that included a comprehensive overview of the government's strengths and weaknesses on trafficking issues and included recommendations for legislative and policy reforms. Morocco is not a party to the 2000 UN TIP Protocol.

See also
Human rights in Morocco

References

Morocco
Morocco
Human rights abuses in Morocco
Crime in Morocco by type
Slavery in Morocco